Semiconservative replication describe the mechanism of DNA replication in all known cells. DNA replication occurs on multiple origins of replication along the DNA template strand (antinsense strand). As the DNA double helix is unwound by helicase, replication occurs separately on each template strand (sense strand) in antiparallel directions. This process is known as semi-conservative replication because two copies of the original DNA molecule are produced, each copy conserving (replicating) the information from one half of the original DNA molecule.  Each copy contains one original strand and one newly-synthesized strand. (Both copies should be identical, but this is not entirely assured.) The structure of DNA (as deciphered by James D. Watson and Francis Crick in 1953) suggested that each strand of the double helix would serve as a template for synthesis of a new strand. It was not known how newly synthesized strands combined with template strands to form two double helical DNA molecules.

Discovery 

Multiple experiments were conducted to determine how DNA replicates. The semiconservative model was anticipated by Nikolai Koltsov and later supported by the Meselson–Stahl experiment, which confirmed that DNA replicated semi-conservatively by conducting an experiment using two isotopes: nitrogen-15 and nitrogen-14. When  was added to the heavy - DNA, a hybrid of - was seen in the first generation. After the second generation, the hybrid remained, but light DNA (-) was seen as well. This indicated that DNA replicated semi-conservatively. This mode of DNA replication allowed for each daughter strand to remain associated with its template strand.

Models of replication 

Semiconservative replication derives its name from the fact that this mechanism of transcription was one of three models originally proposed for DNA replication:

 Semiconservative replication would produce two copies that each contained one of the original strands of DNA and one new strand. Semiconservative replication is beneficial to DNA repair. During replication, the new strand of DNA adjusts to the modifications made on the template strand.
 Conservative replication would leave the two original template DNA strands together in a double helix and would produce a copy composed of two new strands containing all of the new DNA base pairs.
 Dispersive replication would produce two copies of the DNA, both containing distinct regions of DNA composed of either both original strands or both new strands. The strands of DNA were originally thought to be broken at every tenth base pair to add the new DNA template. Eventually, all new DNA would make up the double helix after many generations of replication.

Separation and recombination of double-stranded DNA 
For semiconservative replication to occur, the DNA double-helix needs to be separated so the new template strand can be bound to the complementary base pairs. Topoisomerase is the enzyme that aids in the unzipping and recombination of the double-helix. Specifically, topoisomerase prevents the double-helix from supercoiling, or becoming too tightly wound. Three topoisomerase enzymes are involved in this process: Type IA Topoisomerase, Type IB Topoisomerase, and Type II Topoisomerase. Type I Topoisomerase unwinds double stranded DNA while Type II Topoisomerase breaks the hydrogen bonds linking the complementary base pairs of DNA.

Rate and accuracy 
The rate of semiconservative DNA replication in a living cell was first measured as the rate of the T4 phage DNA strand elongation in phage-infected E. coli. During the period of exponential DNA increase at 37 °C, the rate of strand elongation was 749 nucleotides per second. Thus, semiconservative DNA replication is both rapid and accurate.

Applications 
Semiconservative replication provides many advantages for DNA. It is fast, accurate, and allows for easy repair of DNA. It is also responsible for phenotypic diversity in a few prokaryotic species. The process of creating a newly synthesized strand from the template strand allows for the old strand to be methylated at a separate time from the new strand. This allows repair enzymes to proofread the new strand and correct any mutations or errors.

DNA could have the ability to activate or deactivate certain areas on the newly synthesized strand that allows the phenotype of the cell to be changed. This could be advantageous for the cell because DNA could activate a more favorable phenotype to aid in survival. Due to natural selection, the more favorable phenotype would persist throughout the species. This gives rise to the idea of inheritance, or why certain phenotypes are inherited over another.

See also 
Molecular Structure of Nucleic Acids: A Structure for Deoxyribose Nucleic Acid
DNA replication

References 

DNA replication